Moyra Fraser (3 December 1923 – 13 December 2009) was an Australian-born English actress and ballet dancer, who is best known for playing Penny in the long-running sitcom As Time Goes By. Her sister was the actress Shelagh Fraser. She married author Douglas Sutherland, with whom she had a daughter, and Roger Lubbock, by whom she had two sons.

Early life
Moyra Fraser was born in Sydney, Australia to John Newton Mappin Fraser, a director of Mappin & Webb, and Vera Eleanor (née Beardshaw) on 3 December 1923 and with her family emigrated to the United Kingdom in June 1924. Educated at St Christopher's, Kingswood, and Eversfield, Sutton, she left school at 14 to take up a scholarship with Sadler's Wells Ballet, where she was befriended by Robert Helpmann.

Stage career
Fraser joined the Sadler's Wells Ballet after training, dancing the title role in Giselle, the Lilac Fairy in The Sleeping Princess and creating the role of Hope in The Quest (Ashton/Walton after Spenser). She left the company to play the principal role in Song of Norway at the Palace Theatre, London. Following that Fraser appeared as Venus in The Olympians at Covent Garden, and starred in many plays and pantomimes. These included Girl in the Window and the musical romance Golden City; she was in the revue Airs on a Shoestring at the Royal Court Theatre from 1953 to 1955. The Country Wife followed at the same theatre. She was part of the Old Vic Company in 1959–60, appearing in As You Like It, The Double Dealer and The Merry Wives of Windsor.

In the 1960s and 1970s, she was seen in Through the Looking Glass at the Lyric, Hammersmith, the revue See You Inside, The Buxom Muse, Ring Round the Moon at the Haymarket Theatre in 1968, and for four years was in the farce No Sex Please, We're British.

Film and television
Fraser's first film role was in the musical The Dancing Years (1950), and she then appeared in the David Lean film Madeleine (also 1950). She appeared in the film Here We Go Round the Mulberry Bush (1968) and starred in The Boy Friend (1971). Fraser's television career began in the 1960s, and she appeared on The Benny Hill Show, ITV Playhouse and an episode of Comedy Playhouse in 1973. In 1975, she appeared in two episodes of the BBC Television series The Good Life as Felicity, the wife of Jerry's boss, Andrew.

From 1985 to 1986, Fraser played Annie Jolly in From the Top appearing in a total of 12 episodes. She first played Penny, the sister of Jean's first husband, in 1993, on As Time Goes By. She continued with the part until the programme's final episode in 2005. During the show's run, Fraser appeared in other programmes including Rumpole of the Bailey and Jeeves and Wooster.

Selected filmography
 Madeleine (1950) – Highland Dancer
 The Dancing Years (1950) – Minor Role (uncredited)
 Moulin Rouge (1952) – Cancan Dancer (uncredited)
 The Man Who Loved Redheads (1955) – Ethel
 The V.I.P.s (1963) – Air Hostess
 Here We Go Round the Mulberry Bush (1968) – Mrs. McGregor
 Prudence and the Pill (1968) – Woman in Tea Shop
 The Boy Friend (1971) – Moyra Parkhill / Madame Dubonnet
 Take Me High (1974) – Molly Jones
 A Handful of Dust (1988) – Mrs. Northcote

References

External links

 Programs and related material in the National Library of Australia's PROMPT collection
 Obituary in The Times
 Obituary in The Guardian

1923 births
2009 deaths
Australian emigrants to the United Kingdom
English film actresses
English stage actresses
English television actresses
Dancers of The Royal Ballet
Actresses from London
Actresses from Sydney
21st-century English actresses
20th-century English actresses